Francisco Javier Álvarez Beret (born 2 July 1996), better known by the mononym Beret is a Spanish pop singer.

He was born in Seville, and started early publishing homemade recordings on the internet. In 2018, he signed with the Warner Music Group. Gaining popularity in Spain, he made a leap also in Latin America, through a collaboration with the Colombian singer Sebastián Yatra in the single "Vuelve".

Discography

Albums
2015: Efímero
2015: Vértigo
2016: Ápices
2019: Prisma
2022: Resiliencia

Singles

*Also peaked in Argentina (#31), Colombia (#45) and Ecuador (#96)

Other songs

References

External links
Beret YouTube page 

Spanish male singers
1996 births
Living people
People from Seville